INPT may refer to:

 Indigenous Nationalist Party of Twipra, political party in the Indian state of Tripura
 National Polytechnic Institute of Toulouse, French university system referred to as INPT